Delano Ezra Sam-Yorke (born 20 January 1989) is an English footballer who plays as a striker for Merstham. He most notably featured for Woking, Basingstoke Town, Cambridge United, Lincoln City and Maidstone United.

Career

Woking
Sam-Yorke was born in Hammersmith, London. Originally a winger, he began his career with Wycombe Wanderers, before joining Woking and progressing through the club's academy to make his first-team debut as a substitute on 9 August 2008 in a Conference Premier defeat against Altrincham. His first full appearance came on 25 August 2008 in a 0–0 away draw against Oxford United at the Kassam Stadium. In his first full season as part of the first team, he couldn't prevent Woking from being relegated into the Conference South at the end of the 2008–09 season.

On 19 November 2009, Sam-Yorke joined Isthmian League Premier Division side Cray Wanderers on a one-month loan deal to gain first-team experience. On 29 November 2009, Sam-Yorke scored his first Cray Wanderers goal, providing the winner in a 3–2 victory over Margate.

The following 2009–10 season saw him help Woking to the first round of the FA Cup, playing the full 90 minutes in a 1–0 away loss against League One side Swindon Town.

AFC Wimbledon
Sam-Yorke joined AFC Wimbledon in the summer of 2010 but struggled to break into the first team squad. He subsequently joined Conference South side Basingstoke Town in a loan deal in September 2010. AFC Wimbledon earned promotion into the Football League via the Conference Premier play-offs at the end of the 2010–11 season, however Sam-Yorke left the club at the end of the campaign.

Basingstoke Town
On his release by AFC Wimbledon, he returned to Basingstoke Town on a permanent deal in June 2011. In November 2011, he helped Basingstoke to the first round of the FA Cup, starting in a 1–0 loss against Brentford.

At the end of his first full season at Basingstoke, he was a part of the club's team that reached the Conference South play-offs, however they lost in the semi-finals against Dartford in May 2012. He ended the following 2012–13 season as Basingstoke's top goal scorer however left the club in May 2013.

Cambridge United
He signed for Cambridge United in May 2013, returning to the Conference Premier. He made a successful start to life at the Abbey Stadium, scoring twice on his debut on the opening day of the 2013–14 season in a 5–1 win against FC Halifax Town.

With the majority of his appearances for Cambridge United coming as a substitute, he moved on loan to Conference Premier rivals Lincoln City on 2 January 2014. He scored his first goal for Lincoln in only his second appearance on 7 January 2014 in a 4–1 home win over Alfreton Town.

He returned to Cambridge United, scoring in his first game back at the club in a comprehensive 5–1 victory over Kidderminster Harriers on 1 March 2014. He is considered a cult hero at Cambridge after helping the club to the Conference Premier play-offs by scoring twice in a 2–0 second leg win over FC Halifax Town that secured a 2–1 aggregate win and a place in the final at Wembley Stadium. He started in Cambridge United's play-off final 2–1 win over Gateshead in front of 19,613 supporters at Wembley which earned the club a place back in the Football League.

He remained with Cambridge United following promotion for the start of the 2014–15 season, and made his Football League debut on 9 August 2014 as a substitute in a 1–0 home win over Plymouth Argyle. Three days later he appeared in a League Cup defeat against Birmingham City on 12 August 2014 as a substitute, replacing fellow striker Adam Cunnington at half time in a match that went to extra time.

In September 2014, he returned to the Conference Premier, rejoining Lincoln City for a second loan spell despite reported interest from Grimsby Town. He made his second debut for Lincoln in a 3–1 away loss against his former club, Woking, on 6 September 2014.

Lincoln City

In January 2015, Sam-Yorke made his loan spell a permanent one with a full-time move to Lincoln City on a free transfer. He went on to score a goal in a 2–1 away win over Dover Athletic on 7 March 2015. Meanwhile, he was also sent off in stoppage time in a 2–0 home loss against Welling United on 14 March 2015. At the end of the 2014–15 season he was one of a number of players released by the club.

Forest Green Rovers
On 15 May 2015, he joined Forest Green Rovers, moving to The New Lawn on a one-year contract. He made his debut for the club on 8 August 2016 as a second-half substitute in a 1–0 away win over Altrincham. On 18 January 2016, he joined fellow National League club Boreham Wood on loan until the end of the 2015–16 season. He returned to Forest Green at the end of the season for the club's play-off campaign, which ended in defeat in the play-off final at Wembley Stadium, but was unused and was released on 16 May 2016.

Return to Woking
On 15 July 2016, Sam-Yorke rejoined his first club Woking on a one-year deal after a successful trial. On 10 September 2016, Sam-Yorke made his Woking return in a 1–1 draw against Guiseley, featuring for 65 minutes before being replaced by Chike Kandi. Three days later, Sam-Yorke went on to score a brace in a 3–1 victory over Torquay United, netting both goals in the space of ten minutes.

On 5 January 2017, Sam-Yorke joined fellow National League club Maidstone United on a two-month loan deal. Two days later, Sam-Yorke made his Maidstone debut in a 2–1 defeat against Guiseley, featuring for the entire 90 minutes. In the following fixture, Sam-Yorke scored his first goal for Maidstone United, in their 2–1 victory over Torquay United. After numerous bids for Sam-Yorke's spell at Maidstone to be extended were rejected, he returned to Woking in March 2017, after scoring three times in eight games.

On 21 March 2017, Sam-Yorke scored twice in Woking's 3–1 away victory against Braintree Town, netting both goals in the space of two minutes to give the Cards a 2–1 lead, before Keiran Murtagh finished the scoring in the second half. In the following fixture, Sam-Yorke scored once again, this time against his former club; Maidstone United, netting the Cards' opener in their 4–2 home defeat. The following week, Sam-Yorke continued his impressive scoring record, netting the opener in Woking's 2–1 victory over Sutton United.

Maidstone United
On 9 May 2017, after an impressive loan spell, Sam-Yorke rejoined Maidstone United on a permanent deal. On the opening day of the 2017–18 campaign, Sam-Yorke marked his return during Maidstone's 1–1 draw with Maidenhead United, playing the full 90 minutes. Following his return to the Kent-based side, Sam-Yorke struggled to replicate his form in his previous spell at the club, registering his first goal in September 2017, against former side Woking. Doubling Maidstone's lead in the 67th minute during the 3–1 victory. Two months later, he scored twice during Maidstone's iconic FA Cup first round 4–2 victory over League Two side Cheltenham Town.

On 2 May 2018, it was announced that Sam-Yorke would leave Maidstone at the conclusion of his contract in June.

Dartford
On 16 June 2018, Sam-Yorke signed for Dartford. On 14 November 2018, Sam-Yorke joined Kingstonian on an initial month's loan. On 15 February 2019, Sam-Yorke re-joined Kingstonian on loan until the end of the season.

On 17 July 2019, Sam-Yorke announced his retirement from football at the age of 30.

Merstham
Less than a month after retiring, Sam-Yorke signed for Merstham.

East Grinstead Town
After a troubled 2019–20 campaign, Sam-Yorke joined East Grinstead Town in July 2020.

Return to Merstham
On 20 August 2021, Sam-Yorke made his return to Merstham following a short-term spell with East Grinstead Town.

Career statistics

Honours
Cambridge United
FA Trophy winners: 2013–14
Conference Premier runners-up: 2013–14
Conference Premier play-offs: 2013–14

References

External links

1989 births
Living people
Footballers from Hammersmith
English footballers
Association football forwards
Woking F.C. players
Cray Wanderers F.C. players
AFC Wimbledon players
Basingstoke Town F.C. players
Cambridge United F.C. players
Lincoln City F.C. players
Forest Green Rovers F.C. players
Boreham Wood F.C. players
Maidstone United F.C. players
Dartford F.C. players
Kingstonian F.C. players
Merstham F.C. players
East Grinstead Town F.C. players
National League (English football) players
English Football League players
Isthmian League players